Tony D'Arcy was a senior leader in the Irish Republican Army (IRA) who died as a result of a 52 day Hunger-strike (16 April 1940) at the age of 32.

Background, roles in the IRA and arrest

D'Arcy was from Galway and a member of the IRA during the 1930s. Tonys cousin Louis Darcy, was Commandant of North Galway Brigade IRA during the Irish War of Independence and was killed by British forces in March 1921 at the age of 23.

In 1938 Sean Russell appointed Volunteer Tony D’Arcy to the IRAs Army Council and the Officer Commanding (O/C) of the IRAs Western Command. By 1938 D'Arcy had become a key target for the Irish police Special Branch. In 1939 he was assigned to IRA Headquarters staff. D'Arcy and the younger members of the Headquarters – Michael Traynor and Jack McNeela proposed the launching of raids from the Free State across the border into Northern Ireland. This proposal later became the  1959–62 Border campaign.

D'Arcy was arrested at a Sinn Féin meeting in Dublin on 17 Feb 1940 and imprisoned during The Emergency (Ireland). D'Arcy was sentenced to three months for refusing to account for his movements and for not giving his name and address when arrested. On Sunday 25 February 1940, six republican prisoners embarked on a hunger strike demanding free association and to have two prisoners (IRA Volunteers Nicky Doherty of County Meath and John Dwyer) moved from the criminal wing to the Republican area within the prison (Mountjoy Jail).

Hunger strike, death and response

Joining D’Arcy in the hunger strike were Jack McNeela, Tomás Mac Curtain of Cork (the only son of the martyred Lord Mayor), Jack Plunkett of Dublin, son of Count Plunkett and brother of Joseph Mary Plunkett (executed for his roles in the Easter Rising of 1916), Tommy Grogan of Drogheda and Michael Traynor of Belfast (later Ard-Rúnaí of Sinn Féin).  Close to the annual commemoration of the Easter Rising of 1916, a letter of protest criticizing the governments policy towards the hunger strikers was published from relatives of participants in the Easter Rising and the Lord Mayor of Dublin Kathleen Clarke, the wife of Tom Clarke and sister of Edward Daly (both executed in the Easter Rising of 1916).

After seven days of hunger strike the six strikers were told they would have to stand trial. The hunger strikers refused to go to trial and fought off attempts to bring them to court. D'Arcy, McNeela and Tom Grogan were very badly beaten. While Grogan survived, Tony D'Arcy and Jack McNeela both died within three days of each other on hunger strike in the Military Wing of St Bricins Hospital, Dublin.

The IRA responded to the death of two of its officers with a attack on the seat of the Irish Government – Dublin Castle. In the early morning hours of 25 April 1940, a large land mine was detonated in the Lower Castle Yard which was housed the Detective Division (or Special Branch). Five Detectives reported injury and windows were blown out in the Chapel Royal and State Apartments.

At the time of his death D'Arcy was married with three young children. An owner of a garage and a undertaker by profession, his body was carried in his own hearse, driven by neighbor Joe Glynn of Headford. He was buried at Donaghpatrick Cemetery, Headford (his hometown), County Galway.

Between 1917 and 1981 a total of 22 Irish Republicans have died on Hunger-Strike. The largest hunger strike in Irish history was the 1923 Irish Hunger Strikes.

See also

 Louis Darcy (his cousin)

References

Sources
 http://hungerstrikes.org/forgotten_strikes.html 
 Northern Nationalism, Eamon Phoenix, Ulster Historical Foundation, Belfast 1994 
 The History and Folklore of the Barony of Clare, Michael J. Hughes, c. 1993.
 Biting at the Grave, O'Malley, Padraig, Beacon Press, Boston 1990 
 Pawns in the Game, Flynn, Barry, 2011, Collins Press, Cork, Ireland 

People from County Galway
Irish republicans
Irish prisoners who died on hunger strike
Irish Republican Army (1922–1969) members
1940 deaths